The Youngstown Hawks were an International Basketball Association team based in Youngstown, Ohio, USA from 1999 to 2000.  The team relocated to Saskatoon, Canada.

See also
Saskatchewan Hawks
Ted Stepien

External links
2001 article from sportslawnews.com regarding defamation suit
IBAhoopsonline.com article

Defunct basketball teams in the United States
Sports in Youngstown, Ohio
Basketball teams in Ohio
1999 establishments in Ohio
2000 disestablishments in Ohio
Basketball teams established in 1999
Basketball teams disestablished in 2000